Plantix is a mobile crop advisory app for farmers, extension workers and gardeners. Plantix was developed by PEAT GmbH, a Berlin-based AI startup. The app claims to diagnose pest damages, plant diseases and nutrient deficiencies affecting crops and offers corresponding treatment measures. Users can participate in the online community where they find scientists, farmers and plant experts to discuss plant health issues. Farmers can access local weather, get good agricultural advice throughout the season and receive disease alerts once a disease is spreading in their surrounding.

History 
PEAT GmbH launched the Plantix app in 2015. In April 2020 PEAT acquired the Swiss-Indian startup Salesbee. The company has been featured in major media outlets such as BBC, Fortune, Wired, MIT technology review and Nature. It has also been awarded with the CeBITInnovation Award and the USAID digital smart farming award and the Worlds Summit Award, by the United Nation.

Collaborators 
Plantix cooperates with international research institutes and inter-governmental organizations such as ICRISAT (International Crops Research Institute for Semi-arid Tropics) , CIMMYT (International Maize and Wheat Improvement Center) and CABI (Center for Agriculture and Bioscience International).

References

Android (operating system) software
E-agriculture
Companies based in Berlin